Sankalp Amonkar (born 1975/76) is an Indian politician and businessperson from Goa. He is the current member of Goa Legislative Assembly of Mormugao Assembly constituency. Amonkar contested on Indian National Congress ticket and emerged victorious. He defeated three term BJP MLA, Millind Naik by a margin of 1941 votes.
Amonkar is a former Deputy Leader of Congress Legislative Party, former Vice President of Goa Pradesh Congress Committee, former State President of National Union of Seafarers of India and President of Pradesh Youth Congress.

Early and personal life 
Sankalp Amonkar was born to Padmanabh Amonkar in Goa. He completed his graduation in Bachelor of Arts from Mormugao Education Society Zuarinagar Goa University in 1997. Amonkar is married to businesswoman, Shradha Amonkar and currently resides at Vasco, Goa.

References

1970s births
Living people
Goa MLAs 2022–2027
Former members of Indian National Congress from Goa
Indian businesspeople
Year of birth uncertain
Bharatiya Janata Party politicians from Goa
Businesspeople from Goa